Mark Fiore (born 18 November 1969) in Southwark, Greater London, is an English former professional footballer who played in the Football League as a midfielder.

References

Sources
Mark Fiore at Slough Town
Profile at PlayerHistory

1969 births
Living people
Footballers from Southwark
English footballers
Association football midfielders
Wimbledon F.C. players
Plymouth Argyle F.C. players
Slough Town F.C. players
Walton & Hersham F.C. players
Chesham United F.C. players
Chalfont St Peter A.F.C. players
Windsor & Eton F.C. players
Flackwell Heath F.C. players
English Football League players